Chalderaz-e Beytollah (also Romanized as Chālderāz-e Beytollah) is a village in Barez Rural District, Manj District, Lordegan County, Chaharmahal and Bakhtiari Province, Iran. At the 2006 census, its population was 214, in 43 families.

References 

Populated places in Lordegan County